Laura Nikolich is a game designer and programmer who worked for Parker Brothers in the early 1980s where she was the sole developer for the 1982 Atari 2600 game Spider-Man and programmed the ColecoVision version of Frogger II: ThreeeDeep!.

Education
Laura Nikolich graduated in 1976 with a bachelor's degree in engineering technology from University of South Florida. She learned assembly language, which she used for pager technology at Motorola. Real-time programming in assembly language gave her skills useful for the emerging video game industry.

Career
Laura Nikolich was the fifth programmer hired at Parker Brothers in 1981 and the fourth hired for Atari 2600 development. Nikolich worked alone for six months on the first game based on Spider-Man. Working with the limitations of the system, she designed it as a vertically scrolling game, which was challenging to create. Spider-Man was released in 1982, promoted through television commercials, and was a success.

After Spider-Man, Nikolich developed a Care Bears game, which was never released. The game was dropped because, according to Nikolich, “marketing didn’t know what they wanted”. Nikolich was proudest of her work on Care Bears because of its technical challenges. Her work on manipulating the sprites made the design more lively and impressed people.

Games
 Spider-Man, Atari 2600, Parker Brothers (1982) 
 Frogger II: ThreeeDeep!, ColecoVision, Parker Brothers (1984)

Unreleased
 Care Bears, Atari 2600, Parker Brothers (1983)
 Orbit, ColecoVision, Parker Brothers (1983)

References

External links
Interview on the Spider-Man Crawlspace YouTube channel
Spider-Man TV commercial (1982)

American video game designers
American video game programmers
Women video game designers
Women video game programmers
Year of birth missing (living people)
Living people